The Zenair CH 180 Super Acro-Z is an aerobatic light aircraft, that was designed by Chris Heintz and built by Zenair in the 1980s.

Specifications

See also

References 

1980s Canadian sport aircraft
Homebuilt aircraft
CH 180
Single-engined tractor aircraft
Low-wing aircraft
Aerobatic aircraft
Aircraft first flown in 1982